Mirea is a Romanian surname. Notable people with the surname include:

George Demetrescu Mirea (1852–1934), Romanian portrait painter, muralist, and art teacher
Gheorghe Mirea
Ioan Mirea, Romanian painter and graphic artist

Romanian-language surnames